Meserve may refer to:

Surname 
 Daniel Meserve Durell (1769–1841), American attorney and politician
 Dete Meserve, American media executive
 Nathaniel Meserve (1704–1758), American shipbuilder
 Stan Meserve (born 1941), American racing driver
 Walter F. Meserve (1921–1984), Massachusetts politician
 Walter Joseph Meserve (born 1923), American professor emeritus, playwright, critic and author

Places 
 Meserve Glacier, is a hanging glacier on the south wall of Wright Valley, in the Asgard Range of Victoria Land, Antarctica
 Thompson and Meserve's Purchase,  is a township located in Coos County, New Hampshire, United States